Delhi Gate is an upcoming Pakistani romantic comedy action film. The film is directed by Nadeem Cheema. The film features Jawed Sheikh, Shafqat Cheema, Roma Micheal, Khalid Butt, Qavi Khan, Yasser Khan, Suzain Fatima.

Cast 

 Jawed Sheikh
 Shafqat Cheema
 Roma Micheal
 Khalid Butt
 Qavi Khan
 Yasser Khan
 Suzain Fatima

Production 

Originally, the cast consisted of  Saud, Rashid Mehmood and Umer Cheema, but some of the cast members were later replaced. The film's release was announced for 2020, but because of the COVID-19 pandemic it was delayed. The film was made in the city of Lahore, the first in a long time as most filmmaking had moved from Lahore to Karachi. In 2022, Shamoon Abbasi revealed that the film will be released in mid-2022.

See also
 Cinema of Pakistan
 Lollywood
 List of highest-grossing Pakistani films
 List of Pakistani films of 2018

References 

Pakistani action films
2010s Urdu-language films
Lollywood films